The Lunca Mare is a right tributary of the river Olt in Romania. It discharges into the Olt in Sândominic.

References

Rivers of Romania
Rivers of Harghita County